The Ucross Foundation, located in Ucross, Wyoming, is a nonprofit organization that operates an internationally known retreat for visual artists, writers, composers, and choreographers working in all creative disciplines.

History
Founded in 1981 by Raymond Plank, Ucross is located on a 20,000-acre working cattle ranch in northeastern Wyoming.  The Big Red Ranch Complex, which includes the Foundation’s main offices and a renovated barn that houses a public art gallery, was built in 1882 and is listed on the National Register of Historic Places. The name Ucross comes from the original brand of the Pratt and Ferris Cattle Company in the 1880s, which operated a large ranching concern with Big Red as its headquarters.  Along with James Pratt and Cornelius Ferris, one of the early partners in the ranch was Marshall Field.

Residency and outreach
The Foundation provides living accommodations, studio space, uninterrupted time in the High Plains landscape to competitively selected individuals, for two to six weeks. Up to ten individuals are in residence at any one time. The Foundation has four writing studios, four visual arts studios, and two composing studios and a choreography studio. Approximately ninety-five individuals are supported annually.

Residents live in the historic Ucross School House or the Clearmont Train Depot, which have been renovated to include four bedrooms each, with a dining area, living area, and main kitchen in the School House.

Ucross has hosted over 1,400 artists-in-residence from across the United States and the world. The Foundation participates in a number of long-term collaborations with other arts organizations, including the Sundance Institute Theatre Program, the Alpert Award in the Arts (administered by CalArts and supported by the Herb Alpert Foundation), and the Ernest Hemingway Foundation/PEN Award for First Fiction. Ucross also collaborates with the Alley Theatre, University of Wyoming's MFA Program in Creative Writing, the Pew Fellowships in the Arts, The Ford Family Foundation Fellowship for Oregon Artists, and the Detroit Symphony Orchestra’s Elaine Lebenbom Award for Female Composers.

The Ucross Foundation Art Gallery operates year-round at no cost to the public and typically features exhibitions by Ucross Fellows.  The barn loft provides space for occasional conferences and public concerts.  The Foundation was named a recipient of the Wyoming Governor’s Arts Award for Excellence in the Arts in 2005.

Fellows of note

Notable Ucross Fellows include Ron Carlson, Lan Samantha Chang Du Yun,  Joshua Ferris, Robert L. Freedman, Elizabeth Gilbert, Steve Giovinco, Perry Glasser, Francisco Goldman, Ricky Ian Gordon, Adam Guettel, Jessica Hagedorn, Porochista Khakpour, Michael Harrison, Emily Jacir, Stephen Jimenez, Ha Jin, Jeffe Kennedy, Byron Kim, Verlyn Klinkenborg, Tania Leon, Jason Moran, Bill Morrison, Sigrid Nunez, Ann Patchett, Annie Proulx, Sarah Ruhl, Mark So, Andrew Solomon, Manil Suri, Jean Valentine, Paula Vogel, Terry Tempest Williams, Colson Whitehead, Doug Wright, Charles Wuorinen, and Liz Young.

Land stewardship
Ucross has also supported numerous conservation initiatives, including the planting of thousands of trees on the ranch and the placement of a conservation easement on over 12,000 acres of the ranch with the Wyoming Chapter of The Nature Conservancy. In 2010, the Ucross Ranch, currently leased by the Apache Foundation, was named a finalist for the Leopold Conservation Award, given by the Sand County Foundation.  The newest land initiative at Ucross involves the creation of a community park that honors the Ucross founder’s commitment to land stewardship, along with that of his sons, Roger Plank and Michael Plank.

References

External links
Ucross Foundation
 About Ucross Foundation

Non-profit organizations based in Wyoming
American artist groups and collectives
History of the American West
Arts organizations based in Wyoming
Sheridan County, Wyoming
Arts organizations established in 1981
1981 establishments in Wyoming